Mike Black (born July 25, 1969) is a former American football placekicker who played twelve seasons in the Arena Football League with the Charlotte Rage, Iowa Barnstormers, New York CityHawks, New England Sea Wolves, Buffalo Destroyers, Tampa Bay Storm and Grand Rapids Rampage. He played college football at Boise State University. He was a four-time First Team All-Arena selection.

He currently works as a spotter for ESPN.

References

External links
Just Sports Stats

Living people
1969 births
Players of American football from Washington (state)
American football placekickers
Boise State Broncos football players
Charlotte Rage players
Iowa Barnstormers players
New York CityHawks players
New England Sea Wolves players
Buffalo Destroyers players
Tampa Bay Storm players
Grand Rapids Rampage players
Sportspeople from Bellevue, Washington